The Houseboat is a 2021 German docuseries released on Netflix on March 9, 2021, starring Fynn Kliemann and Olli Schulz.

Cast
 Fynn Kliemann
 Olli Schulz

Episodes

References

External links
 
 

2021 German television series debuts
2021 German television series endings
2020s German comedy television series
2020s documentary television series
German documentary television series
German-language Netflix original programming
Netflix original documentary television series
Documentary television series about architecture
Documentary television series about music